Plainville is the name of numerous places in the United States of America:
Plainville, Connecticut
Plainville, Georgia
Plainville, Illinois
Plainville, Indiana
Plainville, Kansas
Plainville, Massachusetts
Plainville, New Jersey
Plainville, New York
Plainville, Ohio
Plainville, Pennsylvania
Plainville, Wisconsin

It is also the name of two communes and several hamlets in Northern France:
 Plainville (Calvados), ancient commune now included in Percy-en-Auge, Calvados département, Normandy
 Plainville, Eure in the Eure département, Normandy
 Plainville, Oise in the Oise département, Picardy
 Plainville, Hamlet of Marolles-les-Buis in the Eure-et-Loir département, Centre-Val de Loire